Peter King, 7th Baron King of Ockham, Surrey (1775–1833) was an English aristocrat, politician and economic writer.

Life
Born 31 August 1775, baptised 18 September 1789, he was eldest son of Peter King, 6th Baron King, by Charlotte, daughter of Edward Tredcroft of Horsham. He was educated at Eton College and Trinity College, Cambridge, and succeeded to the title in 1793. After a short tour on the continent he returned to England on coming of age, and took his seat in the House of Lords.

Following the Whig traditions of his family, King acted with Lord Holland, whose motion for an inquiry into the causes of the failure of the Anglo-Russian invasion of Holland he supported in his maiden speech, 12 February 1800. His habits, however, were somewhat reclusive. Except to oppose a Habeas Corpus Suspension Bill, or a bill to prolong the suspension of cash payments by the Banks of England and Ireland, begun in 1797, he at first rarely intervened in debate.

King, in 1811, gave his leasehold tenantry notice that he could no longer accept notes in payment of rent, except at a discount varying according to the date of the lease. Ministers, alarmed that his example might be followed widely, quickly introduced a measure making notes of the Banks of England and Ireland payable on demand legal tender in payment of rent out of court, and prohibiting the acceptance or payment of more than 21 shillings for a guinea. King opposed the bill, and justified his own conduct in a speech later published in pamphlet form; but it passed into law, and was followed in 1812 by a measure making the notes legal tender in all cases.

King's political career was cut short by his sudden death on 4 June 1833.

Views
King was an early opponent of the Corn Laws, which he denounced as a "job of jobs". He supported Catholic emancipation and the commutation of tithes, and opposed grants in aid of the Society for the Propagation of the Gospel in Foreign Parts, pluralities and clerical abuses. He was suspected of a leaning to presbyterianism, with attacks on him made as Hierarchia versus Anarchiam (1831) by Antischismaticus and A Letter to Lord King controverting the sentiments lately delivered in Parliament by his Lordship, Mr. O'Connell, and Mr. Sheil, as to the fourfold division of Tithes (1832) by James Thomas Law.

Works
On the currency question King published a pamphlet Thoughts on the Restriction of Payments in Specie at the Banks of England and Ireland, London, 1803,  which went to a second edition. Enlarged, it was reissued as Thoughts on the Effects of the Bank Restrictions, 1804, and was reprinted in A Selection from King's speeches and writings, edited by Earl Fortescue, London, 1844. In this tract King argued that the suspension had caused an excessive issue of notes, particularly by the Bank of Ireland, and a consequent depreciation of the paper and appreciation of bullion; and advocated a gradual return to the system of specie payment. It was reviewed by Francis Horner in the Edinburgh Review, and attracted attention, but without any practical result.

King published also:

 A pamphlet On the Conduct of the British Government towards the Catholics of Ireland, 1807. 
 Speech in the House of Lords on the second reading of Earl Stanhope's Bill respecting Guineas and Bank Notes. 
 The Life of John Locke, with extracts from his Correspondence, Journals, and Commonplace Books, London, 1829; new edition 1830, 2 vols.; in Bohn's Standard Library, London, 1858.
A Short History of the Job of Jobs, written in 1825, first published as an anti-cornlaw pamphlet, London, 1846.

Family
King married, on 26 May 1804, Lady Hester Fortescue, daughter of Hugh Fortescue, 1st Earl Fortescue.

They had five children:  
 Hon. Hester King, m. Sir George Craufurd
 Hon. Anne King
 Hon. Charlotte King m. Reverend Demetrius Calliphronas, rector of Walpole St. Andrew
 William King, who was created Earl of Lovelace in 1838
 Hon. Peter John Locke King.

Notes

Attribution

1776 births
1833 deaths
People educated at Eton College
English politicians
English economists
Peter 7